The collapse of the Hotel New World was a civil disaster that occurred in Singapore on 15 March 1986. The Hotel New World was a six-storey building situated at the junction of Serangoon Road and Owen Road in the Rochor district when it suddenly collapsed, trapping 50 people beneath the rubble. 33 people died and 17 people were rescued.

Background
Hotel New World, officially called the Lian Yak Building, was completed in 1971 and consisted of six storeys and a basement garage. The Hotel New World, previously known as the New Serangoon Hotel until 1984, was the main tenant occupying the top four floors, and a branch of the Industrial & Commercial Bank (which merged with United Overseas Bank in 1987) took up the ground level. 

A nightclub, Universal Neptune Nite-Club and Restaurant, was situated on the second level of the building at the time of the collapse. The building had previously experienced a poisonous gas leak (caused by carbon monoxide) in some of the hotel rooms, first hitting the headlines on 30 August 1975, the day after the poisonous gas leak was reported.

Collapse
Witnesses reported hearing an explosion prior to the collapse, but the police ruled out the possibility of a bomb attack. A gas explosion was thought to be a possible cause.

The collapse was met with shock by many, including the then Prime Minister Lee Kuan Yew who was quoted as saying that "the collapse of such a building is unprecedented."

Casualties
Immediately after the collapse, as many as 300 were feared trapped underneath the debris. Estimates dropped to 100 trapped or missing a day later, and then to 60, including 26 hotel staff and 16 bank staff unaccounted for. The figure was finally put at 33 when the official death toll was announced on 22 March 1986 after the end of the rescue effort. Amongst those killed, 23 were Singaporeans, and the other ten foreigners.

Rescue
After the collapse, many passers-by began to try pulling out survivors. They were soon joined by the Singapore Fire Service (SFS), the Police Task Force of the Singapore Police Force (SPF) and the Singapore Armed Forces (SAF). A nearby business, Eagle Piano Company, became a centre for the rescue operation.

As there were survivors buried in the rubble, the rescue was a delicate operation. Debris was carefully removed as power saws and drills cut through the rubble. Sound detectors were used to locate survivors beneath the slabs by picking up faint moans and cries. In the first 12 hours, nine people were rescued by the SAF. At one time, Lieutenant-Colonel Lim Meng Kin (SAF Chief Medical Officer), along with several other SAF medical officers and two doctors from the Health Ministry, took turns crawling through narrow spaces inside the rubble in an effort to provide assistance to trapped survivors, giving glucose and saline drips to them.

Local tunnelling experts as well as those from Japan, Ireland and the United Kingdom who were involved in nearby construction for the Mass Rapid Transit (MRT), namely Thomas Gallagher, Patrick Gallagher, Michael Prendergast, Michael Scott, and Tan Jin Thong, offered to assist. They became concerned that the use of heavy machinery might collapse the rubble onto those trapped. Their volunteer efforts, digging four tunnels under the rubble, resulted in the rescue of another eight survivors. The tunnelling experts were later honoured by the Singapore government for their efforts.

The last survivor, 30-year-old Chua Kim Choo, was rescued on 18 March 1986, having survived after hiding beneath a table. Following the six-day rescue operation that ended on 21 March, 17 people were rescued, 33 died.

Outcome

Inquiry
Many potential causes of the accident were investigated. Surviving sections of concrete were tested to ensure they were built to proper construction standards and it was found that they were. It was found they had no effect on the building's stability.

Also investigated were the various additions made to the building after its initial construction. Air conditioning systems had been constructed on the roof of the building, the bank had added a large safe, and ceramic tiles had been fixed to the building's exterior, all adding considerably to the building's weight. It was found that the weight of these additions was inconsequential: the original structural engineer had made an error in calculating the building's structural load. The structural engineer had calculated the building's live load (the weight of the building's potential inhabitants, furniture, fixtures, and fittings) but the building's dead load (the weight of the building itself) was completely omitted from the calculation. This meant that the building as constructed could not support its own weight. Three different supporting columns had failed in the days before the disaster, the other columnswhich took on the added weight no longer supported by the failed columnscould not support the building.

According to the local Channel News Asia (CNA), Lian Yak Building was designed by an unqualified draftsman instead of a professional structural engineer. An investigator found that he had over-estimated the dead weight which the columns and walls could support. The draftsman claimed that the building owner Ng Khong Lim, who eventually died in the collapse incident, had appointed him to design Lian Yak Building but Ng directed that building work. The investigator also found that Ng requested to use inferior materials to build Lian Yak Building in order to reduce the cost – ultimately costing his life.

Aftermath
On 27 April 1986, the Government of Singapore honoured five individuals for their assistance in rescue efforts, including three from Ireland, one from the United Kingdom and a local Singaporean. A dinner was also hosted by the Singapore government on 29 April 1986 for public transport operator SMRT Corporation staff involved in the rescue efforts, with Minister of Communications and Information, Yeo Ning Hong, as the guest of honour.

Following this disaster, all buildings built in the 1970s in Singapore were thoroughly checked for structural faults, with some of them declared structurally unsound and evacuated for demolition, including the main block of Hwa Chong Junior College and Catholic High School campus at Queen Street. 

The government also introduced tighter and stringent regulations on building construction; since 1989, all structural designs are required to be counter-checked by multiple Accredited Checkers. The Singapore Civil Defence Force (SCDF) also underwent a significant upgrade, in terms of training and equipment, to improve its readiness in performing future possible complex rescue operations.

Site
Five years after the collapse, construction work commenced on the site for a new seven-story hotel on 28 March 1991. The Fortuna Hotel opened with 85 rooms in 1994.

In media 
In July 1986, Singaporean singer-songwriter Kelvin Tan contributed to BigO magazine's Nothing on the Radio cassette the song "Seen the End", after spending two nights at the former Hotel New World site.

In 1990, the disaster was re-enacted in the Chinese-language television series Finishing Line (出人头地), which was aired on SBC 8.

On 25 September 2003, the disaster was featured in the first episode of the second season of the television series True Courage, which was broadcast on English-language MediaCorp TV Channel 5. A Chinese-language version of the series, titled True Courage (逆境勇者), was also on aired on MediaCorp TV Channel 8.

On 27 September 2005, Seconds From Disaster portrayed the disaster in the episode Hotel Collapse Singapore. Instead of the actual site, the program used an image of the area around 88 Syed Alwi Road (at the corner of Kampong Kapor Road) as the basis for a computer-generated reconstruction of the building and its collapse. The episode was retelecast in Singapore on 16 September 2007 via StarHub TV.

In February 2015, Days of Disasters also portrayed the disaster in the episode Hotel New World Collapse. It was also featured in the drama The Journey: Our Homeland.

References

External links
 
 
 

Man-made disasters in Singapore
1986
Military history of Singapore
1986 in Singapore
1986 disasters in Singapore
March 1986 events in Asia
Disasters in hotels
Demolished buildings and structures in Singapore